is an athletic stadium in Fukuyama, Hiroshima, Japan.

External links

  

Athletics (track and field) venues in Japan
Football venues in Japan
Sports venues in Hiroshima Prefecture
Fukuyama, Hiroshima
Sports venues completed in 1978
1978 establishments in Japan